Corongo can refer to a city, a district and a province in Peru.

For the use of the term in a specific setting, see:

Corongo for the town in Peru
Corongo District for the district in the Corongo province
Corongo Province for the province in Ancash